Kaiser-Wilhelm-Koog is a municipality situated along the North Sea coast in the district of Dithmarschen, in Schleswig-Holstein, Germany.

The municipality is located in and named after the polder, which was finished in 1874 and named in honour of German Emperor William I. The Koog is entirely reclaimed land and therefore a completely flat area and is 0 meters above sea level.

References

Municipalities in Schleswig-Holstein
Dithmarschen
Koogs